St Vincent's Plaza is a major interchange of the Melbourne tram network, serviced by Yarra Trams routes 11, 12, 30 and 109. It is located in the wide centre median of Victoria Parade, wedged between the intersections of Gisborne Street and Brunswick Street.

The interchange was one of Melbourne's first level access superstops to be constructed, opening on 24 July 2002 as part of the 'Tram 109' project. It is named after the adjacent St Vincent's Hospital.

Routes
St Vincent's Plaza is utilised by four of Melbourne's tram routes:
: West Preston to Victoria Harbour Docklands
: Victoria Gardens to St Kilda
: St Vincent's Plaza to Central Pier
: Box Hill to Port Melbourne

It was previously serviced by discontinued routes 24, 31 and 112.

References

East Melbourne, Victoria
Tram stops in Melbourne
Transport in the City of Melbourne (LGA)
Transport infrastructure completed in 2002
2002 establishments in Australia